Middle Kingdom's Mark of Blood, also known as Red Dot Chivalry, is a 1980 film adapted from Gu Long's Chu Liuxiang novel series.

Cast
Ling Yun as Zhongyuan Yidianhong
Tin Hok as Chu Liuxiang
Doris Lung as Ouyang Feng
Betty Pei as Liu Wumei
Cheng Hsi-keng as Hu Tiehua
Wang Hsieh as Du Shengtian
Lo Tik as Ouyang Long
Si Sin-dai as Thirteenth Aunt
Kon Tak-mun as Honest Monk
Man Man
Shih Ting-ken
Luk Yat-lung
Cheung Wai
Leung Yin-man
Gat Man-lap
Hoh Gong

Hong Kong and Philippine releases
Middle Kingdom's Mark of Blood was fully restored and released by Mei Ah Entertainment. It was dubbed in Cantonese and was aired by Asia Television. In the Philippines the movie was produced by Dreamscape Entertainment Television.

External links

1980 films
Hong Kong martial arts films
Taiwanese martial arts films
Wuxia films
Works based on Chu Liuxiang (novel series)
1980 action films
Films based on works by Gu Long
1980s Hong Kong films